The Cornell Cup is an annual college-level embedded design competition created by Cornell Systems Engineering and hosted by Cornell University. The competition was an initiative originally created by Cornell University and Intel, and now partnered with Arm, to "empower student teams to become the inventors of the newest innovative applications of embedded technology". The competition is designed to allow college students the opportunity to transform ideas into real products with actual results. Various awards are given with a range of prizes between $1,000 and $10,000.

History

The competition was announced in late 2011 by Intel as a way of finding and encouraging college students to develop ideas and transform them into robust products. The competition is built based on the highly successful Intel Cup China that attracts over 26,000 students annually.

Qualification
To qualify for the application stage, a team must be formed with the following requirements:

 The team must be between 3 and 5 students
 Each student must be enrolled full-time in any accredited U.S. university
 Students must be enrolled full-time in an undergraduate or masters
 Students must be engineering, science, or computer science students
 Students must complete the application stage by the designated deadline

Competition summary

The competition involves two stages: an applications stage and a finalists stage.

Applications Stage
The application stage typically takes place in the months the previous year of the competition. Teams must complete an application which includes a team interest form, a competition integrity form, and a 7 application questions form by the designated deadline. Applications are reviewed by the Cornell review team which in turn selects up to 35 of the top application submissions. The selected team can then participate in the final competition.

Finalists Support
Finalists are given an array of support as they work through their plan.

 Hardware - Each team is given the latest Intel Atom board. The board is equipped with an Intel Atom, an FPGA, and a large array of I/O. Additionally various other equipment is provided from secondary sponsors.
 Funding - Each team is provided $1,500 in financial support to aid their project and team.
 Access - Each team is given direct access to Intel technical leaders other sponsoring companies' experts who are designing and developing embedded hardware and application commercially.
 Training - Cornell Systems Engineering offers an online guide system to hone students professional design skills
 Invitation - Teams are invited to the public expo

Finalists Stage
The top application submissions that have been chosen have roughly half a year to make their project come to fruition. The teams are responsible for following through their application. A final report is required to be submitted by the deadline. The competition holds an all-day public expo during May where judges hear a six-minutes pitch, asking questions, examining posters, and checking out the demos. Each team undergoes a more in-depth, private review process.

During the final day of the expo, the winners are announced and awarded first, second, or third place in various categories. Various other sponsors may potentially offer special awards to various teams in addition to these awards. The expo takes place at Walt Disney World in May.

Awards

During the expo a number of awards will be given away in addition to the grand prize award.

Cornell Cup USA, presented by Intel Grand Prizes
The top 3 highest total score winners will be awarded first, second, and third Cornell Cup USA, presented by Intel Grand Prizes respectively. Winners are typically announced during the final day of the expo.

The grand prize winner will receive $10,000. Second place team will receive $5,000. Third place team will receive $2,500.

People's Choice Award
During the Cornell Cup Expo, all competition participants will be able to have a single vote for their choice of team. These votes will determine the winning team. People's Choice Award will go to the team receiving the most participants' votes but did not win one of the 3 grand prizes.

Wild Card Award
Teams that have successfully submitted an application, but were not chosen as finalists are allowed to submit a final report. Their final report must follow the same rules and guidelines as the finalists. The Wild Card Award is given to a team who were deemed strong enough by the review judges.

Media Award
Each of the finalist team must create an On-line Chronicle blog using the template provided by the competition. They must also generate social network and media buzz by publishing updates on various channels. The Media Award are judged by members of the media, which is based on team blogs, online channels, and their presentation at the expo.

The top two teams will receive $1,000 awards.

Entrepreneurship Award
In 2014 the competition added a new award, the Entrepreneurship Award, where teams can create a business plan around their Cornell Cup project which could be pitched to venture capitalists. The award was created due to a great interest by past teams that wanted to turn their creative competition inventions into entrepreneurial opportunities after the Cup's final expo.

The winner of the Entrepreneurship Award will receive $2,500.

Past winners

Cornell Cup 2012

 Cornell Cup Grand Prizes
 First Place - IVS, Portland State University
 Second Place - HAWK, University of Pennsylvania
 Third Place - Team Squirtle, Massachusetts Institute of Technology
 People's Choice
 Kinecthesia, University of Pennsylvania
 Wild Card
 Blind Assist, Howard University
 Honorable Mention
 Interactive Multi-Control Wheelchair, Worcester Polytechnic Institute
 Team DART, Seattle Pacific University
 Hot Dawgs, Southern Illinois, University at Carbondale
 Sentinel, University of California, San Diego
 Solar Drone, University of California, Berkeley
 SWARM, Columbia University
 Audio(G)Fusion, University of Houston
 GT Accessors, Georgia Institute of Technology
 The Incredible HUD, Purdue University
 JouleCycle Team, University of Massachusetts, Lowell

Cornell Cup 2013

 Cornell Cup Grand Prizes
 First Place - Titan, University of Pennsylvania
 Second Place - Cyber Physical Systems, Worcester Polytechnic Institute
 Third Place - Intracell, University of Colorado Denver
 People's Choice
 Team BioBot, University of Massachusetts, Lowell & Padmasri Dr. B.V. Raju Institute of Technology (BVRIT)
 Media Award
 Intracell, University of Colorado Denver
 Honorable Mention
 MetroSwift, Oregon State University
 Team Sigma, Howard University
 Assistive Robotic Manipulator (ARM), Columbia University
 ProtoDrive, University of Pennsylvania
 URead Braille, University of Rochester
 PandaCare, University of Pittsburgh
 Team Lions, Columbia University
 Salty Dawgs, Southern Illinois University Carbondale
 Team Ignitus, University of Houston
 Ouroboros, Columbia University

Cornell Cup 2014
The 3rd annual award was held on May, 2014.

 Cornell Cup Grand Prizes
 First Place - Smart Robotic Prosthetic Hand, Worcester Polytechnic Institute
 Second Place - SAFE, Portland State University
 Third Place - Submersibles, Penn State
 Data Analytics Award
 Submersibles, Penn State
 People's Choice
 SmartCollar,  University of Illinois at Urbana-Champaign
 Media Award
 Synergetech, University of Houston
 Entrepreneurship Award
 VDAP, University of Akron
 Honorable Mention
 Mr. Meds, University of Massachusetts-Lowell
 Motion Safe Systems, Oregon State University
 Flux Excursion, Oregon State University
 NAO Navigators, Arizona State University
 VDAP, University of Akron
 SEMG, University of Houston
 FANGS, University of California, San Diego
 Team Envision, Virginia Tech

Cornell Cup 2015 
The Cornell Cup 2015 winners will be announced on May 3, 2015.

See also
 Intel
 Intel Science Talent Search

References

External links 

 Cornell Cup USA Homepage
 Mathworks Intel Cornell Cup

Intel
Challenge awards
Robotics competitions
Recurring events established in 2011